A. mirabilis  may refer to:
 Abagrotis mirabilis, a moth species found in western North America, from British Columbia south to California
 Alaba mirabilis, a sea snail species
 Alicia mirabilis, a sea anemone species
 Ascoseira mirabilis, a brown alga species
 Australartona mirabilis, a moth species found in southern temperate mountain rainforests in New South Wales and southern Queensland

See also
 Mirabilis (disambiguation)